Colorado's 10th Senate district is one of 35 districts in the Colorado Senate. It has been represented by Republican Larry Liston since 2021.

Geography
District 10 covers much of northern Colorado Springs in El Paso County, including parts of the city's Briargate and Northeast neighborhoods.

The district is located entirely within Colorado's 5th congressional district, and overlaps with the 14th, 15th, 16th, and 18th districts of the Colorado House of Representatives.

Recent election results
Colorado state senators are elected to staggered four-year terms; under normal circumstances, the 10th district holds elections in presidential years.

2020

2016

2012

Federal and statewide results in District 10

References 

10
El Paso County, Colorado